The Manjung Municipal Council Stadium or Manjung Stadium is a multi-purpose stadium in Seri Manjung, Manjung District, Perak, Malaysia.

The stadium is the home of Perak II and it previous incarnation, PKNP F.C. as well as Manjung City F.C.

See also
 Sport in Malaysia

References

External links

Manjung District
Football venues in Malaysia
Athletics (track and field) venues in Malaysia
Perak F.C.
Multi-purpose stadiums in Malaysia
Sports venues in Perak